Colonia Jardín is a station on Line 10 of the Madrid Metro and Lines 2 and 3 of the Metro Ligero. It is located in fare Zone A.

References 

Line 10 (Madrid Metro) stations
Railway stations in Spain opened in 2002
Buildings and structures in Latina District, Madrid
Madrid Metro Ligero stations